Bowrampet also Borampet is a village in Medchal district, Telangana, India. It is a part of Dundigal Municipality. The village is fast developing into a major residential and commercial suburb because of the construction of the Outer Ring Road, proximity to the IT corridor of Hyderabad and pollution-free environs. In the past few years realty prices have gone up drastically and is becoming a destination to the cream of the employees from the IT and Education sectors.

It is 8 km from Jawaharlal Nehru Technological University, Hyderabad and Kukatpally, 10 km from Miyapur X roads, 12 km from Madhapur and 3 km from Bachupally.

Outer Ring Road

The 159 km Outer Ring Road, Hyderabad has a major junction at Bowrampet. The road work started here and is scheduled to complete by 2010. This has led to growth in real estate activity with many residential and commercial ventures coming up in the vicinity. It will significantly reduce the distance, travel time and access to different parts of the city.

Residential projects
Gated communities like, Djs homes ( akshayas fortune heights ), Praneeth Pranav Meadows, Sri Avani Projects, Dollar Dreams, Dollar Meadows, SRR Heights with 99-houses community, Keerthi Homes, Tripura Landmark, Durga Vihar gated Villas, Gokul's Brindavanam, SRK Homes, GOTHIC Infra's Pinnacle, Photon, Vajra Builders and Developers' prestigious project of Nature City (Gated community of 66 Villas) and The Royal Park (Gated community - Apartments) is in full swing, with Nature City almost coming to the end of completion and Puravidha are all located here.

Amsri, a realty group, is proposing  integrated residential gated community, adjacent to Outer Ring Road,  called as Amsri Global Village. Mantri Realty, a Mumbai-based realty company is planning two residential complexes comprising 800 apartments.

Rajiv Swagruha, a state-government project for providing houses to the middle class, has its project here.

Commercial area 
Bowrampet has some shops in the village. A public sector bank, SBH, has its branch here. Bowrampet is also home for Incub8 which is a Startup Incubator. Several private companies such as Edvenswa Tech, Edvenswa EPC, INLINE4 Engineering, Vanaha Essentials, Edvenswa Pharmaceuticals, etc. have their registered offices in Bowrampet. 
It is close to Bachupally, which is a major hub for shopping and big commercial establishments.

Schools 
Bowrampet has some good schools in the vicinity like Oakridge International School, a leading IB school, has  campus. Delhi Public School(DPS), Laurus - the Universal school (4-acre campus), Ambitus world School, Unicent International School, Gayathri Vidya Layam etc. Other schools around are Kennedy High, Silver Oaks, Vikas, The Creek, Bhashyam, Victory Model School etc.

Hospitals 
Bowrampet has Snigdha Ayurvedic Hospital which is rated highly since it started operating in February 2020.

Colleges 
An engineering college, DRK Institute of Science and Technology is located on a  campus. Sri Chaitanya IAS academy, Sri Chaitanya Jr. college(BiPC), Sri Chaitanya Boys Hostel, Sri Chaitanya IIT Academy(Boys hostel), Impulse IIT Academy. Other engineering colleges around are VNR Vignana Jyothi (VNRVJIET), JNTU campus, Gokaraju Rangaraju, Mallareddy. It is close to institutes like Sri Chaitanya Academy for Intermediate education, Sri Vidya College of Education. The AP Police is setting up Rangreddy district police training centre here.

Arts Academy

Bhramari kuchipudi dance and arts academy is located near Tripura landmark-2 which provides classical kuchipudi dance and arts regular classes and certifications.

Transport 
Bowrampet is well-connected by TSRTC buses to the city, the routes are:

 272 To Secunderabad Stn (via Gandimaisamma, Jeedimetla, Balanagar, Patny)
 272 J/B To Secunderabad Stn (via Gandimaisamma, Jeedimetla, Balanagar, Jubilee Bus station)
 272 K To Balanagar, ESI (via Gandimaisamma, Jeedimetla)
 272 C To Shalibanda (via Gandimaisamma, Suraram, Moosapet, Nampally, Aliabad) .

The closest MMTS station, for local trains, is 8 kilometers away at KPHB colony. A new station for Metro rail is proposed at Miyapur.

Villages and suburbs around Bowrampet
Mallampet, Bachupally, Nizampet, Kukatpally

References

External links 
 Wikimapia picture of Bowrampet
 APSRTC Buses Time table
 Article in cyerabadtimes.net
 MMTS Time Table

Villages in Ranga Reddy district